Basisperma is a genus of flowering plants in the myrtle family, Myrtaceae first described as a genus in 1942. There is only one known species, Basisperma lanceolata, endemic to Papua New Guinea.

References

Monotypic Myrtaceae genera
Myrtales of Australia
Endemic flora of Papua New Guinea